Governor McCall may refer to:

Samuel W. McCall (1851–1923), 47th Governor of Massachusetts
Tom McCall (1913–1983), 30th Governor of Oregon